The Bathurst Channel is a narrow offshore stretch of water that links Port Davey with Bathurst Harbour in the South West region of Tasmania, Australia. The Bathurst Channel is contained within the Port Davey/Bathurst Harbour Marine Nature Reserve, and the Southwest National Park, part of the Tasmanian Wilderness World Heritage Area.

Features and location
The channel has been studied for estuarine and introduced marine species.

The channel's water is stained red and provides a low light; this allows deeper-water creatures to live in the shallow water. The channel attracts researchers and divers because they can observe deep underwater life without travelling thousands of feet with expensive equipment.

References

Further reading

  1983 edition, published by NSW: William Collins Pty. Ltd., Sydney 
 
 
 
 

South West Tasmania
Protected areas of Tasmania